Antagonist is the debut album of the German metalcore band Maroon.

Track listing
 Tempest I 01:58
 The Beginning of the End 04:05
 An End Like This 03:57
 Shadow of the Vengeance 03:41
 Tempest II 00:19
 Drowning 04:37
 Still Believe In What Has Fallen Apart 05:01
 Beneath The Ashes 03:40
 Stillborn 05:29
 What Remains 02:31
 Declaration 03:15

References

2002 debut albums
Maroon (band) albums